The Hidden Force is a 1900 novel by the Dutch writer Louis Couperus. The narrative is set on the island of Java in the Dutch East Indies. The book was adapted into a 1974 Dutch TV serial. In 2010, a feature-film adaptation was announced as under development with Paul Verhoeven as director.

In 1985 E.M. Beekman published a revised edition of Alexander Teixeira de Mattos' translation dd 1921; a new translation by Paul Vincent came in 2012.

See also
 1900 in literature
 Dutch literature
 Kejawen
 https://www.complete-review.com/reviews/niederld/couperl3.htm

References

1900 novels
Novels by Louis Couperus
Novels set in Java
Novels set in Indonesia